A holiday is a day of observance.

Holiday(s) or The Holiday(s) may also refer to:

 Holiday (travel) (British English) or vacation (American English), a trip or leave of absence for the purpose of recreation or rest
 Annual leave, time off from a job
 Christmas and holiday season or "the holidays", an annual festive period that surrounds Christmas and various other holidays

Places 
 Holiday, Florida, U.S., a census-designated place
 Holiday, a community in Zorra, Ontario, Canada

People
 Holiday (surname)
 Holiday Reinhorn (born 1964), American fiction writer

Arts, entertainment, and media

Film
 Holiday (1930 film), an adaptation of Philip Barry's play (see below), starring Ann Harding and Mary Astor
 Holiday (1931 film), a French film directed by Robert Boudrioz
 Holiday (1938 film), an adaptation of Barry's play, starring Katharine Hepburn and Cary Grant
 Holiday (2001 film), a Russian film directed by Garik Sukachov
 Holiday (2006 film), a Bollywood film by Pooja Bhatt
 The Holiday, a 2006 film starring Cameron Diaz and Kate Winslet
 Holiday (2010 film), a French crime comedy directed by Guillaume Nicloux
 Holidays (2010 film), a Malayalam film directed by M M Ramachandran
 Holiday: A Soldier Is Never Off Duty, a 2014 Bollywood film by A. R. Murugadoss
 Holidays (2016 film), an American horror anthology film
 Holiday (2018 film), a Danish film directed by Isabella Eklöf
 Holiday (2019 film), a Russian film directed by Alexey Krasovsky

Literature
 Holiday (novel), a 1974 novel by Stanley Middleton
 Holiday (play), a 1928 play by Philip Barry
 Holiday, a fictional character in the comics series Batman: The Long Halloween

Music 
 Holiday Records, an American record label
 The Holidays, an Australian indie rock band

Albums 
 Holiday (Alaska in Winter album), 2008
 Holiday (America album), 1974
 Holiday (Earth, Wind & Fire album), 2014
 Holiday (The Magnetic Fields album), 1994
 Holiday (Roberta Flack album), 2003
 Holiday (Russ Freeman album) or the title song, 1995
 The Holiday (album) or the title song, by Futures, 2010
 Holiday, by Jennifer Paige, 2012
 Holiday, by Sammi Cheng, 1991
 Holiday! A Collection of Christmas Classics, by Crystal Lewis, 2000

EPs 
 Holiday EP, by Fiction Family, 2012
 The Holiday EP, by Brand New, 2003
 The Holidays (EP), by The Holidays, 2008
 Holiday, or the title song, by Hrvy, 2017

Songs 
 "Holiday" (Bee Gees song), 1967
 "Holiday" (Dilana song), 2007
 "Holiday" (Dizzee Rascal song), 2009
 "Holiday" (Girls' Generation song), 2017
 "Holiday" (Green Day song), 2005
 "Holiday" (KSI song), 2021
 "Holiday" (Lil Nas X song), 2020
 "Holiday" (Little Mix song), 2020
 "Holiday" (Madonna song), 1983
 "Holiday" (Misia song), 2013
 "Holiday" (Naughty by Nature song), 1999
 "Holiday" (Nazareth song), 1980
 "Holiday" (Vampire Weekend song), 2010
 "Holiday" (Vanessa Amorosi song), 2010
 "Holiday", by the Birthday Massacre from Violet
 "Holiday", by Boys Like Girls from the self-titled album
 "Holiday", by Britt Nicole from Say It
 "Holiday", by Calvin Harris from Funk Wav Bounces Vol. 1
 "Holiday", by Cascada from Perfect Day
 "Holiday", by DJ Antoine
 "Holiday", by Fireworks from All I Have to Offer Is My Own Confusion
 "Holiday", by the Get Up Kids from Something to Write Home About
 "Holiday", by Happy Mondays from Pills 'n' Thrills and Bellyaches
 "Holiday", by Hilary Duff from Best of Hilary Duff
 "Holiday", by Jet from Shine On
 "Holiday", by the Kinks from Muswell Hillbillies
 "Holiday", by the Other Ones
 "Holiday", by Richard Wright from Wet Dream
 "Holiday", by Scorpions from Lovedrive
 "Holiday", by Suzy from Faces of Love
 "Holiday", by Turnstile from Glow On
 "Holiday", by Underground Lovers from Leaves Me Blind
 "Holiday", by Weezer from Weezer (The Blue Album)
 "Holidays", by the Beach Boys from The Smile Sessions
 "Holidays", by Lydia from Devil
 "Holidays", by Miami Horror from Illumination
 "Holidays", by Remady & Manu-L
 "Holidays!", by Peppa Pig from My First Album

Periodicals
 Holiday (magazine), a 1928–1977 American travel magazine
 Holiday (newspaper), a weekly newspaper in Bangladesh

Television 
 Holiday (TV series), a 1969–2007 UK travel review show

Episodes
 "Holiday" (Degrassi: The Next Generation)
 "Holiday" (Dilbert)
 "Holiday" (The Goodies)
 "Holiday" (Miranda)
 "Holiday" (Peep Show)
 "Holiday" (Stargate SG-1)
 "The Holiday" (Take a Letter, Mr. Jones)

Other uses
 Holiday 20, an American sailboat design
 Holiday (horse) (foaled 1911), an American Thoroughbred racehorse
 Holiday Airlines, a defunct Turkish charter company
 Holiday Airlines (US airline), a defunct California intrastate airline
 Holiday Stationstores, a chain of convenience stores in the US
 MS Holiday, a cruise ship
 Holiday, a Pastafarian holiday
 Holiday, an appliance brand owned by Maytag

See also 
 
 
 Halliday
 Holliday (disambiguation)
 Public holiday